El Latino may refer to:

 El Tiempo Latino (formerly El Latino), Washington, D.C.
 El Museo Latino, Omaha, Nebraska